Miloš Nikolić (born 26 January 1987) is a former Serbian football defender.

References

External links
 

1987 births
Living people
People from Pirot
Association football defenders
Serbian footballers
FK Radnički Pirot players
FK Car Konstantin players
FK Sinđelić Niš players
Serbian First League players